The 1951 Walker Cup, the 13th Walker Cup Match, was played on 11 and 12 May 1951, at Royal Birkdale Golf Club, Southport, Lancashire, England. The United States won by 6 matches to 3 with 3 matches halved.

Format
Four 36-hole matches of foursomes were played on Friday and eight singles matches on Saturday. Each of the 12 matches was worth one point in the larger team competition. If a match was all square after the 36th hole extra holes were not played. The team with most points won the competition. If the two teams were tied, the previous winner would retain the trophy.

Teams
Great Britain & Ireland had a team of 10 plus a non-playing captain. The United States only selected a team of 9, which included a playing captain. Frank Deighton was in the Great Britain & Ireland team but was not selected for any matches.

Great Britain & Ireland
 & 
Captain:  Raymond Oppenheimer
 Jimmy Bruen
 Ian Caldwell
 Joe Carr
 Frank Deighton
 Cecil Ewing
 Alex Kyle
 John Langley
 Max McCready
 John Llewellyn Morgan
 Ronnie White

United States

Playing captain: Willie Turnesa
William C. Campbell
Dick Chapman
Charles Coe
Bobby Knowles
Jim McHale Jr.
Harold Paddock Jr.
Frank Stranahan
Sam Urzetta

Friday's foursomes
Jimmy Bruen, who was paired with John Llewellyn Morgan, had a recurrence of a wrist injury during his match. The match was close until the 8th hole on the afternoon round but, with Bruen's wrist getting worse, the American pair of Turnesa and Urzetta then won 6 holes in a row to win 5&4. Bruen withdrew from the singles.

Saturday's singles

References

Walker Cup
Golf tournaments in England
Walker Cup
Walker Cup
Walker Cup